Sandakot Na Bala is a 1988 Philippine action drama film directed by Jose N. Carreon, who co-wrote the script with Ricky Lee, on his directorial debut. The film stars Rudy Fernandez alongside Gloria Romero, Eddie Garcia, Nadia Montenegro, Monica Herrera, RR Herrera, Billy Joe Crawford, and Melanie Marquez. Sandakot Na Bala is the first action film produced by Regal Films, and was released on October 13, 1988.

The film received a positive reception from critics such as Lav Diaz, who praised its focus on the adverse psychological effects of gun violence on individuals.

Cast
Rudy Fernandez as Emil
RR Herrera as Young Emil
Gloria Romero as Elena
Eddie Garcia as Daniel
Melanie Marquez as Claudia
Nadia Montenegro as Melissa
Monica Herrera as Alicia
Billy Joe Crawford as Jun Jun
Subas Herrero as Rico
Zandro Zamora as Rigor
Gil de Leon as Paras
Mario Escudero as Bino
Robert Talabis as Rolly
Romeo Rivera as Renato

Production
Rudy Fernandez chose to star in Sandakot Na Bala before starring in Ang Bala at ang Rosaryo, as he wished to prove something first. Ang Bala at ang Rosaryo was supposed to be his first film for Regal Films, and Snooky Serna would have been his love interest, though the project did not come to fruition.

Though Regal Films served as distributor of a few action films in the past, Sandakot Na Bala is the first action film to be produced by the studio, with the personal supervision of executive producer Lily Monteverde.

Release
Sandakot Na Bala was released on October 13, 1988.

Box office
The film grossed ₱1.8 million on its opening day.

Critical response
Lav Diaz, writing for the Manila Standard, gave Sandakot Na Bala a positive review, commending the film's thematic focus on the adverse psychological effects of gun violence on an individual. He also gave praise to director Jose N. Carreon for handling action sequences well in his directorial debut. Justino Dormiendo of the National Midweek also applauded Carreon's "impressive" initial directorial effort for being "an insightful look at the culture of violence and its debilitating effects on the young mind."

Accolades

References

External links

1988 films
1980s action drama films
1988 action films
Philippine films about revenge
Philippine action films
Regal Entertainment films
Cockfighting in film